Mario Hernández Fernández (born 25 January 1999) is a Spanish professional footballer who plays for Rayo Vallecano as a right back.

Club career
Born in Madrid, Hernández joined Rayo Vallecano's youth setup in January 2016, from Atlético Madrid. He made his senior debut with the reserves on 2 September 2017, starting in a 2–0 Tercera División home win against RSD Alcalá.

Hernández scored his first senior goal on 2 May 2018, netting a last-minute winner in a 2–1 away defeat of CD San Fernando de Henares. On 17 August, he moved on loan to Recreativo de Huelva in Segunda División B, but was unable to play as his registration did not arrive on time at the Royal Spanish Football Federation.

On 4 January 2019, Hernández left Recre and moved to fellow third division side UD Melilla, on loan for the remainder of the season. On 15 August, he joined UD San Sebastián de los Reyes in the same category, also in a temporary deal.

Upon returning, Hernández featured with the first team in the pre-season, and made his professional debut on 13 September 2020 by starting in a 1–0 away win against RCD Mallorca.

Career statistics

Club

References

External links

1999 births
Living people
Footballers from Madrid
Spanish footballers
Association football defenders
Segunda División players
Segunda División B players
Tercera División players
Rayo Vallecano B players
Recreativo de Huelva players
UD Melilla footballers
UD San Sebastián de los Reyes players
Rayo Vallecano players